Rimouski (also known as Rimouski—Témiscouata, Rimouski—Mitis and Rimouski-Neigette-et-la Mitis) was a federal electoral district in Quebec, Canada, that was represented in the House of Commons of Canada from 1867 to 2003.

It was created by the British North America Act, 1867 as "Rimouski" riding.

After the 1980 federal election, it was renamed "Rimouski—Témiscouata". In 1996, it was renamed "Rimouski", and before the 1997 election, it was renamed "Rimouski—Mitis". Before the 2000 election, it was renamed "Rimouski-Neigette-et-la Mitis".

It was abolished in 2003 when it was redistributed into Rimouski—Témiscouata and Matapédia—Matane ridings.

Members of Parliament
This riding has elected the following Members of Parliament:

Election results

Rimouski

Rimouski—Témiscouata

Rimouski—Mitis

Rimouski—Neigette-et-la Mitis

See also 

 List of Canadian federal electoral districts
 Past Canadian electoral districts

References

External links 

Riding history from the Library of Parliament:
Rimouski (1867 - 1980)
Rimouski—Témiscouata (1980 - 1996)
Rimouski (1996 - 1997)
Rimouski—Mitis (1996 - 1997)
Rimouski-Neigette-et-la Mitis (1997 - 2000)

Former federal electoral districts of Quebec